The 2013 Torneo Internacional AGT was a professional tennis tournament played on hard courts. It was the eleventh edition of the tournament which was part of the 2013 ATP Challenger Tour. It took place in León, Mexico between 1 and 7 April 2013.

Singles main-draw entrants

Seeds

 1 Rankings are as of March 18, 2013.

Other entrants
The following players received wildcards into the singles main draw:
  Mauricio Astorga
  Alex Bogomolov Jr.
  Erik Crepaldi
  Nicolás Massú

The following players received entry as a special exempt into the singles main draw:
  Alessio di Mauro

The following players received entry from the qualifying draw:
  Antoine Benneteau
  Thomas Fabbiano
  Franko Škugor
  Denis Zivkovic

The following player received entry as a lucky loser:
  John-Patrick Smith

Doubles main-draw entrants

Seeds

1 Rankings as of March 18, 2013.

Other entrants
The following pairs received wildcards into the doubles main draw:
  Mauricio Astorga /  Manuel Sánchez
  Juan Manuel Elizondo /  Nicolás Massú
  Alfredo Moreno /  Alejandro Moreno Figueroa

Champions

Singles

 Donald Young def.  Jimmy Wang, 6–2, 6–2

Doubles

 Chris Guccione /  Matt Reid def.  Purav Raja /  Divij Sharan, 6–3, 7–5

External links
Official Website

Torneo Internacional AGT
Torneo Internacional Challenger León
2013 in Mexican tennis